Bogidiella is a genus of crustacean in the family Bogidiellidae, containing the following species:

Bogidiella albertimagni Hertzog, 1933
Bogidiella antennata Stock & Notenboom, 1988
Bogidiella aprutina Pesce, 1980
Bogidiella aquatica G. Karaman, 1990
Bogidiella arganoi Ruffo & Vigna-taglianti, 1974
Bogidiella arista Koenemann, Vonk & Schram, 1998
Bogidiella atlantica Sànchez, 1991
Bogidiella balearica Dancau, 1973
Bogidiella barbaria G. Karaman, 1990
Bogidiella broodbakkeri Stock, 1992
Bogidiella calicali G. Karaman, 1988
Bogidiella capia G. Karaman, 1988
Bogidiella cerberus Bou & Ruffo, 1979
Bogidiella chappuisi Ruffo, 1952
Bogidiella chitalensis G. Karaman, 1981
Bogidiella coipana Ortiz, Winfield & Lalana, 2001
Bogidiella convexa Stock & Notenboom, 1988
Bogidiella cooki Grosso & Ringuelet, 1979
Bogidiella cypria G. Karaman, 1989
Bogidiella cyrnensis Hovenkamp, Hovenkamp & Van der Heide, 1983
Bogidiella dalmatina S. Karaman, 1953
Bogidiella deharvengi Stock & Botosaneanu, 1989
Bogidiella gammariformis Sket, 1985
Bogidiella glabra Stock & Notenboom, 1988
Bogidiella glacialis G. Karaman, 2002
Bogidiella hamatula Stock, 1985
Bogidiella helenae Mateus & Maciel, 1967
Bogidiella hispanica Stock & Notenboom, 1988
Bogidiella indica Holsinger, Reddy & Messouli, 2006
Bogidiella ischnusae Ruffo & Vigna Taglianti, 1975
Bogidiella lindbergi Ruffo, 1958
Bogidiella longiflagellum S. Karaman, 1959
Bogidiella madeirae Stock, 1994
Bogidiella mexicana G. Karaman, 1981
Bogidiella michaelae Ruffo & Vigna-Taglianti, 1977
Bogidiella minotaurus Ruffo & Schiecke, 1976
Bogidiella neotropica Ruffo, 1952
Bogidiella nicolae G. Karaman, 1988
Bogidiella niphargoides Ruffo & Vigna-Taglianti, 1977
Bogidiella paolii Hovenkamp, Hovenkamp & Van der Heide, 1983
Bogidiella paraichnusae G. Karaman, 1979
Bogidiella perla Stock, 1981
Bogidiella prionura Stock, 1985
Bogidiella purpuriae Stock, 1988
Bogidiella ringueleti Grosso & Fernandez, 1988
Bogidiella ruffoi Birstein & Ljovuschkin, 1967
Bogidiella sbordonii Ruffo & Vigna-Taglianti, 1974
Bogidiella semidenticulata Meštrov, 1962
Bogidiella serbica G. Karaman, 1988
Bogidiella silverii Pesce, 1981
Bogidiella sinica Karaman & Sket, 1990
Bogidiella sketi G. Karaman, 1989
Bogidiella skoplgensis (S. Karaman, 1933)
Bogidiella spathulata Stock & Rondé-Broekhuizen, 1987
Bogidiella stocki G. Karaman, 1990
Bogidiella talampuyensis Grosso & Glaps, 1985
Bogidiella thai Botosaneanu & Notenboom, 1988
Bogidiella torrenticola Pretus & Stock, 1990
Bogidiella turcica Vonk, Seveso & Noteboom, 1999
Bogidiella uncinata Stock & Notenboom, 1988
Bogidiella uniramosa Stock & Rondé-Broekhuizen, 1987
Bogidiella vandeli Coineau, 1968
Bogidiella virginalis Stock, 1981
Bogidiella vomeroi Ruffo & Vigna-Taglianti, 1977

References

Gammaridea
Taxonomy articles created by Polbot